Aaro Hellaakoski (June 22, 1893 – November 23, 1952) was a Finnish poet whose work includes some of the earliest examples of modernism in Finnish literature.

Hellaakoski was born in Oulu. By profession he was a geographer conducting studies in physical geography and geomorphology and working as a school teacher of geography as well as  a  university teacher. As a geographer he published scientific studies on topics such as the geological history of lake Saimaa and the geological history of lake Puula and spent his summers in geomorphological fieldwork in the Finnish Lakeland for many years. He also wrote some geography textbooks for schools together with other scholars.

Examples of poetry

1943

1946

Bibliography

Poetry
 Runot, 1916
 Nimettömiä lauluja, 1918
 Me kaksi, 1920
 Elegiasta oodiin, 1921
 Maininki ja vaahtopää, 1924
 Jääpeili, 1928
 Valitut runot, 1940
 Vartiossa, 1943
 Uusi runo, 
 Huojuvat keulat, 1946
 Hiljaisuus, 1949
 Sarjoja, 1952 
 Huomenna seestyvää, 1953,
 Nimettömiä lauluja, 1918

Prose
 Suljettujen ovien takana, 1923. (novel)
 Iloinen yllätys, 1927. (short stories)

Essays and art criticism
 Kuuntelua, 1950.
 T. K. Sallinen, 1921.
 Niinkuin minä näin, 1959.

Scientific works
 Puulan järviryhmän kehityshistoria, 1928.
 Suursaimaa, 1922.

References
 
Tikkanen Matti: Aaro Hellaakoski - runoileva maantieteilijä [Aaro Hellakoski, a poet and a geographer]. Terra, 1993, 105:2, pp. 67–82. Helsinki: Geographical Society of Finland.

External links

  (in Finnish)
 
 

1893 births
1952 deaths
People from Oulu
People from Oulu Province (Grand Duchy of Finland)
Finnish male poets
Finnish geographers
Finnish art critics
Writers from Northern Ostrobothnia
20th-century Finnish poets
20th-century male writers
People of the Finnish Civil War (White side)
20th-century geographers